Lusail station is the northern terminus of the Doha Metro's Red Line and serves the city of Lusail. It is located on Al Khor Coastal Road.

History
The station was opened to the public on 10 December 2019 along with three other Red Line stations, over six months after the opening of the line's first 13 stations.

Station facilities
Facilities in the station include a prayer room and restrooms.

Connections
There is one metrolink, which is the Doha Metro's free feeder bus network, servicing the station:
M145, which serves Doha Festival City in Umm Salal Municipality.

References

Doha Metro stations
2019 establishments in Qatar
Railway stations opened in 2019
Lusail